Baileya may refer to:

 Baileya (plant), a genus of desert marigolds
 Baileya (moth), a genus of moths
 Baileya (journal), the quarterly journal of horticultural taxonomy

Genus disambiguation pages